Ulrich Heinrich Emil Richard Greifelt (8 December 1896 – 6 February 1949) was a German SS functionary and war criminal during the Nazi era. He was convicted at the RuSHA trial at Nuremberg, sentenced to life imprisonment, and died in prison.

Biography
Greifelt was born in Berlin in 1896, the son of a pharmacist. He joined the German army in 1914 and fought in the First World War. After the war, he retired from the army with the rank of Oberleutnant. Subsequently, he was a member of the Freikorps. During the Weimar Republic, Greifelt worked as an economist at a Berlin joint-stock company until he was laid off in 1932 due to the difficult economic situation in Germany.

After the Machtergreifung, Hitler's rise to power, Greifelt joined the Nazi Party in April 1933 (member no. 1,667,407) and the SS in June 1933 (member no. 72,909). As of August 1933, Greifelt was a speaker on the Persönlicher Stab Reichsführer-SS. From early March to mid-June 1934, Greifelt was business leader for the chief of staff of SS-Oberabschnitts Mitte/Elbe, and then by mid-January 1935, chief of staff of SS-Oberabschnitt Rhein/Rhein-Westmark/Westmark. He then headed the Central Registry of the SS-Hauptamt.

After the beginning of the Second World War, Greifelt was appointed Chief of Staff of RKFDV (Reichskommissar für die Festigung deutschen Volkstums; Reich Commissioner for the Consolidation of German Nationhood) in October 1939. He was instrumental in the "planning and implementation of population relocation in the context of Generalplan Ost". In the SS, Greifelt rose quickly through the ranks, reaching Gruppenführer (lieutenant general) by 1941. He ultimately reached the rank of SS-Obergruppenführer und General der Polizei on 30 January 1944.

In February 1942, whilst serving on Heinrich Himmler's staff, Greifelt wrote a directive for dealing with children. He claimed that the Polish government had been responsible for seizing ethnic German children and placing them in orphanages and it was the duty of the Nazis to reclaim these children. He continued that those who "looked" German should be taken from orphanages, taken for examination at the SS-Rasse- und Siedlungshauptamt before undergoing extensive psychological study. Those that were found to be of desirable racial stock were to be sent to German boarding schools and subsequently made available for adoption by the families of SS members, with their Polish origin to be concealed from any prospective parents.

After World War II, Greifelt was arrested in May 1945. Greifelt was sentenced to life imprisonment at the RuSHA trial on 10 March 1948. He had been found guilty as the person mainly responsible for the expulsion of people from Slovenia, Alsace, Lorraine and Luxembourg. He died while serving his sentence at the prison for war criminals in Landsberg. Greifelt argued in his defence that he had the welfare of the people whom he expelled at heart and wanted to help them to find "the consolidation of their existence and thereby of their Germanism." His claims were rejected however and he was sentenced under recently passed genocide legislation.

Notes

References

In German

 

1896 births
1949 deaths
People from Berlin
German people convicted of crimes against humanity
Nazis convicted of war crimes
People convicted by the United States Nuremberg Military Tribunals
People from the Province of Brandenburg
German prisoners sentenced to life imprisonment
Prisoners sentenced to life imprisonment by the United States military
Prisoners who died in United States military detention
SS-Obergruppenführer
20th-century Freikorps personnel
Holocaust perpetrators
Slovenia in World War II
History of Alsace
History of Lorraine
Recipients of the Iron Cross (1914), 1st class
Nazis who died in prison custody